Eucalyptus brevifolia, commonly known as snappy white gum or northern white gum, is a tree that is endemic to northern Australia. It has smooth, powdery white bark, lance-shaped adult leaves, buds arranged in group of seven, white flowers and cup-shaped or barrel-shaped fruit.

Description
The bark is smooth, white and powdery. Flowering occurs between March and August and the flowers are white or creamy yellow.

Taxonomy and naming
Eucalyptus brevifolia was first formally described in 1859 by Ferdinand von Mueller and the description was published in the Journal of the Proceedings of the Linnean Society, Botany. The specific epithet (brevifolia) is from the Latin words brevis meaning "short" and folium meaning "leaf", referring to the relatively short leaves.

Distribution and habitat
Snappy white gum grows on slopes and rocky hill tops in the Kimberley region of Western Australia and in nearby parts of the Northern Territory between the Victoria River and the northern Tanami Desert where it grows in shallow skeletal soils.

See also

List of Eucalyptus species

References

Eucalypts of Western Australia
Trees of Australia
brevifolia
Myrtales of Australia
Plants described in 1859
Taxa named by Ferdinand von Mueller